Sarah Halley Finn is an American casting director. With well over 100 feature films and multiple awards to her credit, she is best known for casting the Marvel Cinematic Universe – a body of work including the second-highest grossing movie of all time, Avengers: Endgame. Other works include Oscar-winning films Black Panther; Three Billboards Outside Ebbing, Missouri; and Crash; all of which earned Finn the Casting Society of America’s highest honor, the Artios Award for Outstanding Achievement in Casting. Those films also won the prestigious SAG Award for Outstanding Performance by a Cast in a Motion Picture. On January 19, 2023, Finn was nominated for the BAFTA Award for Best Casting for her work on Everything Everywhere All at Once, which she also co-produced.

Career 
In 2006, she was hired to cast the first Marvel Cinematic Universe (MCU) film, Iron Man. Aside from that film, Sarah Finn has served as the casting director for every MCU movie, Disney+ television series, and special. Screen Rant wrote that "One of the greatest assets of the Marvel Cinematic Universe is its casting, courtesy of Sarah Finn, who has been heavily involved in choosing actors for Marvel since the beginning." She proposed Chris Pratt for the role of Peter Quill. Finn proposed to do a screen test with Robert Downey Jr. to show that he was right for the role. She also pushed for Chris Hemsworth as Thor. Her casting process was described as "out of the box". Dominique Thorne described Finn as an "advocate of mine, supporting me and what I was doing".

Finn's collaboration with Marvel Studios includes 36 films and 16 shows to date. Beyond Marvel, Finn cast the Star Wars series, The Mandalorian, created by Jon Favreau and Dave Filoni, as well as The Book of Boba Fett.

Recently released projects include Everything, Everywhere All at Once from The Daniels – which earned Finn a BAFTA nomination – The Gray Man from the Russo brothers, and the Lionsgate/Showtime series The First Lady, directed by Susanne Bier and for which Finn was also a co-producer.

Some of Finn's past credits include Chef; Oliver Stone's  Wall Street: Money Never Sleeps; Martin McDonagh’s Seven Psychopaths and Shane Black’s The Nice Guys; sports films Miracle, Coach Carter, She's the Man, and Blue Crush; animated films The Little Prince, The Jungle Book (2016), and The Lion King (2019); and action films such as Fast & Furious and Kick-Ass.

A graduate of Yale University and member of AMPAS (Executive Committee, Casting Branch), Sarah has served on the Executive Board of Women in Film (WIF) and is on the Board of Advisors for the Master Class educational series.

Awards and nominations 

Sarah garnered a 2023 BAFTA nomination for Best Casting in recognition of her work on Everything Everywhere All at Once. In 2021, Finn was nominated for two Emmy Awards: a Primetime Emmy Award for Outstanding Casting for a Limited or Anthology Series or Movie for Wandavision, and a Primetime Emmy Award for Outstanding Casting for a Drama Series for The Mandalorian. She has also been nominated numerous times by the Casting Society of America for her work, winning for The Lion King, Crash, Three Billboards Outside Ebbing, Missouri, Black Panther and Spider-Man: No Way Home.

In 2022, she received four Artios Award nominations, being the second-most nominated casting director in the ceremony.

Filmography

Selected film credits

Selected television credits

References

External links 
 

American casting directors
Women casting directors
Year of birth missing (living people)
Living people